Spectrum Telecoms is an independent business connectivity provider, supplying a range of business IP and communications services.

Company Overview 
Spectrum Telecoms is the trading name for Spectrum Telecommunications Ltd. Spectrum was founded by Simon Holt in 1996. The company was created with the aim of providing traditional fixed line services, account management and systems. By building a network of supplier partnerships the business grew into inbound, outbound, mobile and data networks .

In 2013, the company moved from Barton-under-Needwood into larger premises, located on the Centrum 100 Business Park, Burton upon Trent.

In  December 2013, the company became an authorised supplier for Connection Vouchers. The Scheme is managed by Broadband Delivery UK (BDUK), a unit within the Department for Culture, Media and Sport.

Products & Services 
Spectrum Telecoms provides products and services in 5 main categories:

 Unified communications
 Managed private networks
 Cloud and hosted services
 Enterprise mobility
 Network security

PR & Social Responsibility 
Spectrum's Director Jenny Lee Holt judged the 2016 finals of the West Midlands Young Enterprise Company of the Year, held at the Lichfield Garrick Theatre. The award was won by the Students of Alleyne's High School in Staffordshire.

References 

Companies based in Staffordshire